Rodrigo Steimbach Silva (born 30 January 1996) is a Brazilian field hockey player. He competed in the men's field hockey tournament at the 2016 Summer Olympics.

References

External links
 

1996 births
Living people
Brazilian male field hockey players
Sportspeople from Rio de Janeiro (city)
Olympic field hockey players of Brazil
Field hockey players at the 2016 Summer Olympics
21st-century Brazilian people